Maheśvara (Sanskrit: महेश्वर; Pali: Mahissara; traditional Chinese/Japanese: 大自在天; Pinyin: Dàzìzàitiān, Rōmaji: Daijizaiten) is the ruler of all three realms of samsara in Buddhist Mythology. He is also sometimes referred to as Sabbalokādhipatī Devā in Pali literature. His main duty is to give spiritual knowledge. The Buddhist Maheshvara is revered as a Bodhisattva.

Etymology 

The Sanskrit name Maheśvara is composed of two "Mahā" and "Īśvara". The "ā" of mahā and the "ī" of īśvara combine to form a sandhi, which becomes "e", forming the word "Maheśvara". Mahā means "Great" and Īśvara means "lord", hence the name Maheśvara means "the great lord".

Contemporary Maheśvara 

Present Maheśvara is Buddhist by religion, and was reborn as a Deva, because of his merit of donating a cup of honey to Kassapa Buddha in one of his previous lives.  According to Karandavyuha Sutra, Maheśvara was born from the brow of Bodhisattva Avalokiteshvara. According to Buddhist traditions, he helps good people, mostly who follow the Buddhist precepts and eat a vegetarian diet, and also punishes bad people for their evil deeds. He helps yogis doing Kundalini Meditation. He is bodhisattva of Tenth Bhumi. He is one of the important deity venerated in Sri Lankan Buddhism. He is one of the twenty four protective deities of Chinese Buddhism and of the sixteen dharmapalas of Tibetan Buddhism.

Maheśvara and Vajrapāni 

A popular story tells how Vajrapāni kills one Maheśvara, because of his evil deeds. The story occurs in several scriptures, most notably the Sarvatathāgatatattvasaṅgraha and the Vajrāpanyābhiṣeka Mahātantra. The story begins with the transformation of the bodhisattva Samantabhadra into Vajrapāni by Vairocana, the cosmic Buddha, receiving a vajra and the name "Vajrāpani". Vairocana then requests Vajrapāni to generate his adamantine family in order to establish a mandala. Vajrapāni refuses because Maheśvara "is deluding beings with his deceitful religious doctrines and engaging in all kinds of violent criminal conduct". Maheśvara and his entourage are dragged to Mount Meru, and all but Maheśvara submit. Vajrapāni and Maheśvara engage in a magical combat, which is won by Vajrapāni. Maheśvara's retinue become part of Vairocana's mandala, except for Maheśvara, who is killed, and his life transferred to another realm where he becomes a Buddha named Bhasmeśvaranirghoṣa, the "Soundless Lord of Ashes".

Mantra 
 Chinese:
 
  
  
 Japanese:
 
  
  

Both the Chinese and Japanese mantras are phonetic transcriptions of verses originally composed in Sanskrit.

See also 
 Śakra - Ruler of Tavatimsa heaven
 Mahabrahma - Ruler of Brahma world
 God in Buddhism

References 

Buddhist mythology
Buddhist gods
Twenty-Four Protective Deities